Poiana is a commune in Galați County, Western Moldavia, Romania with a population of 2,150 people. It is composed of two villages, Poiana and Vișina. These were part of Nicorești Commune until 2004, when they were split off.

References

Communes in Galați County
Localities in Western Moldavia